Brainard is a hamlet in the town of East Nassau, Rensselaer County, New York, United States. Brainard has a post office with ZIP code 12024, which opened on April 7, 1881.

The community was named after David Brainard, a Christian missionary to local Indians.

References

Hamlets in Rensselaer County, New York
Hamlets in New York (state)